Sturges is an unincorporated community in Livingston County, in the U.S. state of Missouri.

History
A post office was established at Sturges in 1882, and remained in operation until 1937. The community may derives its name from Samuel D. Sturgis, an officer in the Civil War.

References

Unincorporated communities in Livingston County, Missouri
Unincorporated communities in Missouri